Sam Andrew Gumbley (born 4 August 1992), known professionally as S-X, is a British singer, songwriter and record producer. As a record producer, Gumbley has worked with high-profile artists such as Chance the Rapper, Childish Gambino, Future, Lil Wayne, Meek Mill, KSI and Nicki Minaj. He was Grammy-nominated for his work on Childish Gambino's album Because the Internet (2013).

Gumbley gained mainstream popularity as a singer-songwriter when he featured on (and produced) KSI's 2019 single "Down Like That", alongside Rick Ross and Lil Baby. The song peaked at number 10 on the UK Singles Chart and it was certified silver by the British Phonographic Industry (BPI) for exceeding sales of 200,000 units in the UK. Gumbley has since released the singles "Neither Would I", "Dangerous" and "Feels So Good".

Early life
Samuel Andrew Gumbley was born on 4 August 1992 in Wolverhampton, England. When he was in Year 7, Gumbley began playing the drums and producing music in FL Studio. He attended Smestow School in Wolverhampton, before studying music production at the City of Wolverhampton College, where he attended the same class as Liam Payne.

Career
Aged 15, Gumbley produced the instrumental "Woo Riddim", which two years later became a popular grime instrumental after being used by British MC D Double E for his 2010 song "Bad 2 Tha Bone". S-X was signed to Atlantic Records during his time working as a record producer.

In early 2017, Gumbley began to use his own vocals over his beats, establishing himself as a singer-songwriter as well as just a producer.

In 2018, Gumbley was the opening act for British singer-songwriter Lily Allen throughout the North American and European leg of her No Shame Tour.

On 4 July 2019, Gumbley released "Always Wrong" as the first single from his mixtape True Colours.

On 8 November 2019, British YouTuber and rapper KSI released "Down Like That", which features Gumbley alongside American rappers Rick Ross and Lil Baby, with Gumbley also handling the song's production. The song peaked at number 10 on the UK Singles Chart, becoming Gumbley's first song to impact the UK charts and his highest-charting single in the UK to date. In February 2020, the song received a Silver certification from the British Phonographic Industry (BPI) for exceeding sales of 200,000 units in the UK. The song also charted at number 77 on the Billboard Canadian Hot 100.

On 10 January 2020, Gumbley released a single titled "Neither Would I".

In 2020, Gumbley starred alongside KSI as cast members of the second series of Channel 4's Celebrity Gogglebox.

In May 2020, Gumbley signed with Universal Music Group and Eterno Music after attracting interest from several major record labels. On 18 September 2020, Gumbley released a single titled "Dangerous".

In May 2021, Gumbley departed from Universal Music Group and Eterno Music and signed with RBC Records and BMG. He released his first single through the record label, "Feels So Good", on 28 May 2021, which was followed by the release of his next single, "Too Late in the Night", on 21 July 2021.

In July 2021, S-X announced his debut studio album "things change"

Personal life
Gumbley is an avid supporter of Wolverhampton Wanderers F.C. Since 2019, he has been a proud ambassador of the club's foundation called the "Wolves Foundation."

Discography

Studio albums
 Things Change (2022)
Mixtapes
 Reasons (2018)
 Temporary (2018)
 True Colours (2019)
 A Repeat Wouldn't Go A Miss (2021)

Filmography

References

1992 births
21st-century British male singers
21st-century English singers
English male singer-songwriters
English male singers
English pop singers
English record producers
living people
musicians from the West Midlands (county)
musicians from Wolverhampton
Trap musicians
British electronic musicians
British contemporary R&B singers
English tenors